The 6th Japan Record Award was held on December 26, 1964.

Emcee
Takayuki Akutagawa
5th time as the emcee of JRA.

Award Winners
Japan Record Award
 Kazuko Aoyama for "Ai To Shi Wo Mitsumete" 
 Lyricist: Hiroko Ōya 
 Composer: Keishirō Tsuchida 
 Arranger: Keishirō Tsuchida 
 Record Company: Nippon Columbia

Vocalist Award
Youko Kishi for "Yoake No Uta"

New Artist Award
Teruhiko Saigō for "Kimi Dake Wo" and "17-O No Kono Mune Ni"
Harumi Miyako for "Anko Tsubaki Wa Koi No Hana"

Composer Award
Hiroshi Miyagawa for "Una Sera Di Tokyo"
Singer: The Peanuts

Arranger Award
Shinzou Teraoka for "Ozashiki Kouta"
Singer: Hiroshi Wada & Mahina Stars

Lyricist Award
Tokiko Iwatani for "Una Sera Di Tokyo"
Singer: The Peanuts

Special Award
Haruo Minami for "Tokyo Olympic Ondo"

Planning Award
King Records for "Natsukashi No Asakusa Opera"

Children's Song Award
Otowa Yurikago Kai for "One Two Three Go"

Nominations

JRA

New Artist Award
Male

Female

References

Japan Record Awards
Japan Record Awards
Japan Record Awards
1964